Helicobasidium purpureum is a fungal plant pathogen which causes violet root rot in a number of susceptible plant hosts. It is synonymous with Helicobasidium brebissonii (Desm.) Donk. It is the teleomorph of Tuberculina persicina which is its mycoparasitic anamorph.

Varieties 
There are three varieties:
Helicobasidium purpureum var. barlae Bres. 1909
Helicobasidium purpureum var. orientalePat. 1920
Helicobasidium purpureum var. purpureum(Tul.) Pat. 1885

Distribution 
Helicobasidium purpureum has a cosmopolitan distribution and is found in all regions in which its host plants grow.

Host plants 
In the United Kingdom, colonies of Helicobasidium purpureum have been found on the living stems of dog's mercury (Mercurialis perennis) and  stinging nettle (Urtica dioica). The fungus is also associated as a saprobe with decaying wood and stumps of broad leaf trees. Its rhizoctonian anamorph infects the roots of carrot (Daucus carota), parsnip (Pastinaca sativa), swede (Brassica napus ssp rapifera), turnip (Brassica rapa), celery (Apium graveolens), asparagus (Asparagus officinalis), beetroot (Beta vulgaris), potato (Solanum tuberosum) and sea kale (Crambe maritima). Wild plants on which it has been found felting the roots with purple or brown mycelium include chickweed (Stellaria) spp., sow thistles (Sonchus) spp., nettles (Urtica) spp., shepherd's purse (Capsella bursa-pastoris) and yarrow (Achillea millefolium).

Symptoms 
In susceptible crops, any parts below the ground are liable to infection. The mycelium of the fungus forms a matted, felt-like purple covering which grows over the surface of the root. Soil particles adhere to this and small, dark-coloured sclerotia grow among the hyphae. A dry rot occurs and secondary rots may move in. Mycelial threads, often merging into strands, grow through the soil and infect nearby plants. A pink or brown mat of mycelial threads may grow above the soil surface. In affected plants, the aerial parts may wilt and have discoloured, stunted foliage.

Control 
Violet root rot chiefly occurs in waterlogged, acid soils. These conditions can be improved by choosing a well-drained location to grow root crops and liming the soil. Individual affected plants can be removed and destroyed. The mycelium and sclerotia remain infective for some time and the ground should not be used again for root crops for at least four years. In the interim, susceptible weeds should not be allowed to grow.

References 

Fungal plant pathogens and diseases
Vegetable diseases
Teliomycotina
Fungi described in 1885
Taxa named by Edmond Tulasne